The 2013 Hamilton Tiger-Cats season was the 56th season for the team in the Canadian Football League and their 64th overall. The Tiger-Cats finished in 2nd place in the East Division with a 10–8 record, which was their first winning season since 2004. The Ti-Cats played in their first Grey Cup championship game since 1999, but lost to the hometown Saskatchewan Roughriders 45-23 in the 101st Grey Cup. The Tiger-Cats primarily played their home games at Alumni Stadium in Guelph, Ontario while also playing one game at Moncton Stadium in Moncton, New Brunswick.

Stadium
Due to the demolition of Ivor Wynne Stadium and the construction of Tim Hortons Field on the same site, the Tiger-Cats were forced to play the majority of their home games outside of Hamilton for the first time in franchise history. On November 20, 2012, the Tiger-Cats announced the signing of a memorandum of understanding to play most of their 2013 schedule at a renovated Alumni Stadium in Guelph.  The decision came after scouting and considering several other venues within and outside the region. Ron Joyce Stadium, the nearest available stadium, ruled itself out in June 2012.

On March 5, 2013, the 2013 schedule was released, revealing that eight of the regular season games would be played in Guelph and one would be played in Moncton, New Brunswick as part of Touchdown Atlantic. When the Tiger-Cats clinched a home game in the 2013 playoffs, the team announced that that game would also be played in Guelph.

Offseason

CFL Draft
The 2013 CFL Draft took place on May 6, 2013. The Tiger-Cats had eight selections in the seven-round draft, including the first overall pick. The club had an additional selection in the fifth round coming from Calgary after a trade for Milton Collins.

Preseason

Regular season

Season standings

Season schedule

Roster

Coaching staff

Playoffs

Schedule

East Semi-Final

East Final

Grey Cup

References

Hamilton Tiger-Cats seasons
Ham